Kalil Pimpleton (born December 9, 1998) is an American football wide receiver for the New York Giants of the National Football League (NFL). He played college football at Central Michigan and was an undrafted free agent from the 2022 NFL Draft.

College career
He signed with Virginia Tech out of high school and played in 4 games in 2017 before transferring to Central Michigan where he played from 2019 to 2021.  He earned MAC Special Teams Player of the Year honors in 2021 for is kick returning and was a first team All-MAC wide receiver.

Professional career

Detroit Lions
On April 30, 2022, Pimpleton was signed by the Detroit Lions after going undrafted. On August 29, Pimpleton was waived by the Lions.

New York Giants
On September 1, 2022, Pimpleton was signed to the New York Giants practice squad. He signed a reserve/future contract on January 22, 2023.

References

External links
 New York Giants bio
 Central Michigan Chippewas bio

1998 births
Living people
People from Muskegon, Michigan
Sportspeople from Muskegon, Michigan
Players of American football from Michigan
American football wide receivers
New York Giants players